The 2018–19 Ottawa Senators season was the 27th season of the Ottawa Senators of the National Hockey League (NHL). The Senators failed to qualify for the playoffs for the second consecutive year. The season saw the trading away of several notable veterans including Erik Karlsson, Matt Duchene, Mark Stone and Ryan Dzingel and the firing of coach Guy Boucher.

Team business
In May 2018, the club announced the appointment of Nicolas Ruszkowski as its new chief operating officer. Ruszkowski has a background in public relations. Ruszkowski will be in charge of business operations and will not have a role in hockey operations.

Assistant general manager Randy Lee was suspended by the club in June, after being charged for offences during the NHL Entry Draft Combine in Buffalo, New York. He resigned from the position in August.

The Belleville Senators head coaching vacancy was filled in June when the Senators announced the hiring of Troy Mann, a veteran of ten seasons in the North American minor leagues.

The Senators named a new assistant general manager on September 17. The new assistant general manager is Peter MacTavish, who was previously with law firm Norton Rose Fulbright Canada LLP, and CAA Hockey.

The Senators announced that the Brampton Beast will be the team's official ECHL affiliate after the Montreal Canadiens decided not to renew their affiliation with the Beast.

Trinity was developing a site adjacent to the LeBreton Flats site and the Senators felt this was inappropriate competition. Trinity responded with a  dollar lawsuit, accusing the Senators of being unwilling to contribute any money to the project. The National Capital Commission (NCC), in charge of the public lands the arena would be situated on, announced the cancellation of the partnership's bid to develop the site, but gave the sides an extension when the two parties agreed to mediation. On February 27, 2019, it was announced that mediation between the parties had failed to come to an agreement and that the NCC would explore other options for the site's redevelopment.

Off-season
In July, the Senators avoided arbitration with winger Mark Stone coming to agreement on a $7.3 million one-year contract. Contract negotiations with defenseman Cody Ceci went to arbitration, where he was awarded a $4.3 million one-year deal.

In August, the Senators' 2018 first-round pick Brady Tkachuk decided to forego further seasons in university to turn professional with the Senators, signing a three-year entry-level contract. The Senators hired former player Chris Kelly as a development coach on September 4, 2018. He joins former player Shean Donovan as development coach.

A contract extension was offered to captain Erik Karlsson on July 1, with no terms disclosed publicly. Karlsson turned down the offer, prompting media speculation about his status. The media reported that Karlsson was free to negotiate terms with other teams, however, no trade was made at the time. Trade speculation heated up as the team neared training camp, and the team finally made a deal with the San Jose Sharks on September 13, one day before training camp. The team received two NHL players (Dylan DeMelo, Chris Tierney), two young prospects (Josh Norris and Rudolfs Balcers), and first-round and second-round draft picks in exchange for Karlsson. Karlsson did not agree to a contract extension with the Sharks, and a second-round draft pick of the Sharks will go to the Senators should he re-sign with San Jose. An additional pick will go to the Senators should the Sharks trade Karlsson to the Eastern Conference.

Pre-season
The Senators played in the Kraft Hockeyville game again in pre-season, playing the Toronto Maple Leafs in Lucan, Ontario on September 18. The team played a six-game pre-season schedule, including two against Toronto, two against Montreal and two against Chicago.

Regular season
The Senators' first game of the season, also the home opener, was on October 4, 2018, versus the Chicago Blackhawks. In the team's 26 seasons of play, this was the first time the Blackhawks were the opening night opponent.

During November, a video leaked of seven Senators players, including Matt Duchene, Chris Wideman, Chris Tierney, Dylan DeMelo and Thomas Chabot, mocking the team during an Uber ride from a game. The five-minute video featured the players laughing at the team's low ranked penalty kill, poor special teams and insulting assistant coach Martin Raymond, who was not present in the vehicle. The video quickly went viral, and started a dialogue about privacy and consent about recording conversations. The players involved issued apologies for their comments.

At the trade deadline, the Senators traded away their top three scorers: Mark Stone, Matt Duchene and Ryan Dzingel; all were scheduled to become unrestricted free agents in July and had not agreed to contract extensions. Duchene and Dzingel were traded away to the Columbus Blue Jackets, and Stone was traded to the Vegas Golden Knights. At the trade deadline, the Senators were in last place in the NHL, a position they would hold for the rest of the season.

On March 1, 2019, head coach Guy Boucher was fired and associate coach Marc Crawford was named as interim head coach.

Playoffs
The Senators failed to qualify for the 2019 Stanley Cup playoffs after being eliminated on March 9, 2019, following a 3–2 loss to the Boston Bruins.

Standings

Schedule and results

Pre-season
The pre-season schedule was published on June 18, 2018.

Regular season
The regular season schedule was released on June 21, 2018.

Players

Statistics
Final Stats

Skaters

Goaltenders

†Denotes player spent time with another team before joining the Senators. Stats reflect time with the Senators only.
‡No longer with team.
Bold denotes team leader in that category.

Awards and honours

Awards
 Thomas Chabot - selected to 2019 National Hockey League All-Star Game roster

Milestones

Records

Transactions
The Senators have been involved in the following transactions during the 2018–19 season.

Trades

Free agents

Waivers

Contract terminations

Retirement

Signings

Suspensions/fines

Draft picks

Below are the Ottawa Senators' selections at the 2018 NHL Entry Draft, which was held on June 22 and 23, 2018, at the American Airlines Center in Dallas, Texas.

Notes:
 The Senators acquired the 26th-overall pick from the New York Rangers in exchange for the 22nd-overall pick (the Pittsburgh Penguins' first-round pick) and the 48th overall pick. The 22nd-overall pick was previously acquired by the Senators as the result of a trade on February 23, 2018, that sent Vincent Dunn and a third-round pick in 2018 to Pittsburgh in exchange for Ian Cole, Filip Gustavsson and this pick.
 The New Jersey Devils' second-round pick went to the Senators as the result of a trade on June 22, 2018, that sent Pittsburgh's first-round pick in 2018 (22nd overall) to the New York Rangers in exchange for Boston's first-round pick in 2018 (26th overall) and this pick.
 The New York Rangers' seventh-round pick went to the Senators as the result of a trade July 18, 2016, that sent Mika Zibanejad and a second-round pick in 2018 to New York in exchange for Derick Brassard and this pick.

References

Ottawa Senators seasons
Ottawa Senators
Senators
2018 in Ontario
2019 in Ontario
2010s in Ottawa